Reier Broadcasting Company was an American radio broadcasting company based in Bozeman, Montana. Started in 1975, it was owned by the Reier Family; Bill Reier was the president. The Reier Broadcasting Company rebranded itself in 2005 as the KBOZ Radio Stations Group. The offices and all stations' studios were located southwest of Bozeman at "Radio Ranch", 5445 Johnson Road.

On June 1, 2018, Reier Broadcasting took its five stations silent. The company cited owner Bill Reier's long-term illness and several lingering issues, including station license renewals delayed by outstanding Federal Communications Commission (FCC) regulatory fees dating back to 2012.

At the time of the shutdown, Reier operated five radio stations in the Bozeman area:

Bill Reier died on September 2, 2019. All five station's licenses were involuntary assigned to Richard J. Samson, as Receiver, effective December 6, 2019. The five stations were acquired by Desert Mountain Broadcasting in 2021.

References

External links

Defunct radio broadcasting companies of the United States
Mass media in Montana
Companies based in Montana
Mass media companies established in 1975
1975 establishments in Montana
Mass media companies disestablished in 2019
2019 disestablishments in Montana